Short track speed skating is a sport that is contested at the Winter Olympic Games. The first Winter Olympics, held in 1924, included speed skating, but the first official short track speed skating events were not held until the 1992 Winter Olympics in Albertville, France. Before 1992, short track speed skating events were held at the 1988 Winter Olympics as a demonstration sport. At those games, events for both men and women were held in five disciplines: 500 metre, 1000 metre, 1500 metre, 3000 metre and the relay (3000 metres for women, 5000 metres for men). The Netherlands, United Kingdom and South Korea won two gold medals each, with Canada, Italy, Japan and China picking up a gold medal each. The results of those demonstration events are not considered official and are not included in this list. At the 1992 Winter Olympics, there were four medal events: men's 1000 metres, men's 5000 metre relay, women's 500 metres and women's 3000 metre relay. Men's 500 metres and women's 1000 metres were added in 1994. The men's and women's 1500 metres were added in 2002 and these eight events have been held at every Olympic Games since. In 2022, a ninth event was added to the program: the mixed 2000 metre relay. 

Arianna Fontana of Italy is the most decorated short-tracker in Olympic history, having won eleven medals, including two gold medals, four silver medals, and five bronze medals. Viktor Ahn of Russia, formerly of South Korea with his birth name of Ahn Hyun-soo, is the most decorated male short-tracker in Olympic history, having won eight medals including six gold medals and two bronze. Apolo Ohno of the United States also has eight Olympic medals (two gold, two silver, four bronze). Tania Vicent of Canada is the oldest athlete to medal; she was 34 in 2010 when she won a silver medal in the 3000 metre relay. Kim Yoon-Mi of South Korea is the youngest; she was 13 when she won a gold in the same event in 1994.

At the 1992 Winter Olympics, South Korea's Kim Ki-hoon became the first short track speed skater to win two gold medals, by winning gold medals in both of the available events (1000m, 5000m relay). In 1994 Kim (1000m) and American Cathy Turner (500m) became the first to successfully defend their respective Olympic title; Kim thus became the first short-tracker to win three Olympic gold medals. In 1998, Chun and Yang Yang (S) of China became the first short-tracker to win three medals in one Olympic. By helping South Korea to defend 3000m relay title as well as defending her 1000m gold medal, Chun became the first (and thus far, only) athlete to successfully defend two Olympic titles. In 2006, South Korea's Jin Sun-Yu and then Ahn Hyun-Soo became the first two short-trackers to have won three gold medals in one Olympic. Ahn also won a bronze medal in the same Games, becoming the first (and thus far, only) short-tracker to win four medals in one Olympic; he repeated the same feat in 2014. In 2010, Wang Meng became the first athlete to have won three individual gold medals in the sport, and in 2014 Ahn became the first to have won four individual gold medals, and six gold medals overall in the sport. South Korean short track speed skaters have won a combined 49 medals, including 25 golds, more than any other nation in both measures. South Korea is also the only country to have won at least one gold medal at every Olympics in which short-track speed skating has been held; Canada and China share with South Korea the honour of being the only nations to have athletes win a medal at every Olympics in the sport. As of the 2018 Winter Olympics, 192 medals (64 of each color) have been awarded and have been won by short track speed skaters from 14 National Olympic Committees (NOC).



Men

500 metres

1000 metres

1500 metres

5000 metre relay

Women

500 metres

1000 metres

1500 metres

3000 metre relay

Mixed

Mixed 2000 metre relay

 Skaters who did not participate in the final, but received medals.

Statistics

At 31 years and 191 days, Vladimir Grigorev became the oldest man to win a short track Olympic medal, winning silver at the 1000m event, at the 2014 Olympics on 15 February 2014. On 21 February 2014, he won the gold in the 5000m relay, upping the oldest male shorttrack athlete record for both medals and gold medals.

Athlete medal leaders

Include athletes with at least 3 medals of any colour.

Medals per year
Key
Numbers in bold indicate the highest medal count at that year's Olympic Games.

References
General

 1992–2002: 
Men's: 500m 1000m 1500m 5000m relay
Women's: 500m 1000m 1500m 3000m relay
2006: 

Specific

External links
 Short Track Speed Skating - Olympics at Sports-reference.com
 Olympic Review and Revue Olympique. LA84 Foundation

Short track speed skating
Medalists
 
Speed skating-related lists